Madan Mohan Malaviya University of Technology (MMMUT) is a Premier State Technical University in Gorakhpur, Uttarpradesh, India. It was established in 2013 by upgrading Madan Mohan Malaviya Engineering College (MMMEC), which was established in 1962, into a university. The MMMUT was named after Pandit Madan Mohan Malaviya, an Indian scholar and educational reformer. Its programs have been conferred in autonomous status under the university. The university has a very strong alumini network as it has crossed over 60 years of establishment. It offers Bachelors, Masters, and Doctoral programs in engineering, natural sciences and humanities as well as Masters programs in Computer Application (MCA) and Business Administration (MBA). 

MMMUT is one of the best state government university in Uttar Pradesh with an impeccable academic and placement record.

History 
MMMUT has its roots with Madan Mohan Malaviya Engineering College (MMMEC), established in 1962. In October 2012, the Government of Uttar Pradesh announced that it will upgrade the college into a residential university, quoting the lack of technical education in Uttar Pradesh since the reorganisation of 2000, when Roorkee University went to Uttrakhand. The university was established a year later through the Uttar Pradesh Madan Mohan Malaviya University of Technology Act, 2013, which was passed by the government in September 2013.

Admissions
Under Graduate Admissions 
Undergraduate admissions until 2014 were being done through the Uttar Pradesh State Entrance Examinations SEE-UPTU, also known as UPSEE. Post the college was recognized as a State Technical University, the admissions to UG courses were taken through an admission test conducted by MMMUT named as Malaviya Entrance Test (MET).
From the session 2021-2022, Joint Entrance Examination – Main (JEE-MAIN) conducted by the National Testing Agency (NTA) replaced the MET for future BTech (First Year) admissions in the University.

Post Graduate Admissions
Admission in MTech programme is done on the basis of Graduate Aptitude Test in Engineering- GATE Score of the candidate. 
And admission to courses like MCA and MSc were also taken by Madan Mohan Malaviya University of Technology, Gorakhpur through Malaviya Entrance Test (MET) till the academic session 2020-2021.
The University has finally decided to take future admissions in its BBA, B. Pharm., BTech II (Lateral Entry), MBA, MCA, MTech in 12 specialization streams, MSc courses through Uttar Pradesh Combined Entrance Test (UPCET) from the academic session 2021-2022.
The UPCET-2021 will also be conducted by National Testing Agency. UPCET is the replacement of UPSEE conducted earlier and is also referred as Uttar Pradesh Joint Entrance Examinations (UPJEE).
Reservation rules are followed in admissions as per the norms of UP Govt./MMMUT, Gorakhpur.

Accreditation 
In 2022, MMMUT has been accredited with A grade by the National Assessment and Accreditation Council (NAAC), the first state university in Uttar Pradesh to get this rank.

Rankings

The National Institutional Ranking Framework (NIRF) ranked the university in the 251–300 band (the lowest band) in the engineering ranking of 2022.

References

External links
 

Universities in Uttar Pradesh
Engineering colleges in Uttar Pradesh
Education in Gorakhpur
Educational institutions established in 1962
1962 establishments in Uttar Pradesh
Dr. A.P.J. Abdul Kalam Technical University